Matthew Robson (born 29 December 1954) is an English former footballer who played as a centre half in the Football League for Darlington.

Robson was born in Easington, County Durham. He began his football career as an apprentice with Sunderland, but never played for their first team. In March 1975, he joined Darlington on loan. He made just one appearance, on 29 March, starting at centre half in a 2–1 defeat away to Crewe Alexandra in the Fourth Division.

References

1954 births
Living people
Sportspeople from Easington, County Durham
Footballers from County Durham
English footballers
Association football defenders
Sunderland A.F.C. players
Darlington F.C. players
English Football League players